Bréal's Cup is the trophy awarded to Spyros Louis, the Marathon winner at the first modern Olympic Games held in Athens, in 1896. The Cup was designed by French philhellene Michel Bréal, who had the original idea to include a Marathon race in the Olympic Games.

The Cup is made of pure silver. On the top part of the Cup there is the inscription "OLYMPIC GAMES 1896, MARATHON TROPHY DONATED BY MICHAEL BREAL". The remaining surface of the Cup had a relief decoration depicting birds and aquatic plants, which were known to exist in the swamp lands of Marathon in ancient times. With this reference, Breal wanted to give the Cup a symbolic significance and connect the ancient Olympic Games with the modern ones. 
Today, the Cup belongs to the Stavros Niarchos Foundation, which acquired it at an auction held on April 18, 2012 by Christie's in London. A delegation from the Municipality of Amarousion, the birthplace of Spyros Louis, attended and bid in the auction. The Cup was sold by the grandson of Spyros Louis, who has the same name.

References 

Awards established in 1896